This is a list of tambon (sub-districts) in Thailand, beginning with the letters H and I. This information is liable to change due to border changes or re-allocation of Tambons. Missing Tambon numbers show where the number is either not used or the Tambon has been transferred to a different Amphoe.

See also
Organization of the government of Thailand
List of districts of Thailand
List of districts of Bangkok
List of tambon in Thailand
Provinces of Thailand
List of municipalities in Thailand

 H